is a passenger railway station located in the city of Kazo, Saitama, Japan, operated by the private railway operator Tōbu Railway.

Lines

Station layout
 
This station consists of two opposed side platforms serving two tracks, connected to the station building by a footbridge.

Platforms

Adjacent stations

History
Yagyū Station opened on 1 November 1929.

From 17 March 2012, station numbering was introduced on all Tōbu lines, with Yagyū Station becoming "TN-06".

Passenger statistics
In fiscal 2019, the station was used by an average of 1196 passengers daily (boarding passengers only).

Surrounding area
Kitakawabe Post Office

See also
 List of railway stations in Japan

References

External links

  

Railway stations in Saitama Prefecture
Stations of Tobu Railway
Tobu Nikko Line
Railway stations in Japan opened in 1929
Kazo, Saitama